The Côney is a  long river in the Vosges and Haute-Saône départements, northeastern France. Its source is near Lion Faing, a lieu-dit in Dounoux. It flows generally southwest. It is a left tributary of the Saône into which it flows in Corre.

It shares its valley with the canal de l'Est on most of its course.

Départements and communes along its course
This list is ordered from source to mouth: 
Vosges: Dounoux, Uriménil, Uzemain, Xertigny, Charmois-l'Orgueilleux, La Chapelle-aux-Bois, Harsault, Les Voivres, Hautmougey, Bains-les-Bains, Fontenoy-le-Château, Le Magny, Montmotier, 
Haute-Saône: Ambiévillers, Mailleroncourt-Saint-Pancras, Pont-du-Bois, Alaincourt, Selles, La Basse-Vaivre, Passavant-la-Rochère, Demangevelle, Vougécourt, Corre,

References

Rivers of France
Rivers of Vosges (department)
Rivers of Haute-Saône
Rivers of Grand Est
Rivers of Bourgogne-Franche-Comté